China CITIC Bank International Limited (Chinese: 中信銀行(國際), CNCBI in short) is a full-service commercial bank in Hong Kong. China CITIC Bank Corporation Limited, via its wholly-owned subsidiary CITIC International Financial Holdings Limited, is CNCBI’s controlling shareholder with a 75% stake.  The CITIC Group Corporation of Beijing is CNCBI’s ultimate parent company. In 2018, CNCBI launched its mobile banking platform inMotion. CNCBI has 27 branches and two business banking centres in Hong Kong, as well as international locations. As of 30 June 2022, CNCBI’s total assets stands at HK$449.50 billion.

References
https://www.cncbinternational.com/_document/about-us/interim-and-annual-reports/en/2022/intrep.pdf

Banks established in 1998
Banks of Hong Kong
CITIC Group
Companies formerly listed on the Hong Kong Stock Exchange